A Cinderella Story is an American anthology series of films created by Leigh Dunlap and based on the Cinderella fairytale. The film series is owned and distributed by Warner Bros. Although the first film was theatrically released, all the remaining films were direct-to-video.

Films
 A Cinderella Story (2004)
 Another Cinderella Story (2008)
 A Cinderella Story: Once Upon a Song (2011)
 A Cinderella Story: If the Shoe Fits (2016)
 A Cinderella Story: Christmas Wish (2019)
 A Cinderella Story: Starstruck (2021)

Crew

References

External links
 
 
 
 
 
 

Film series introduced in 2004
Musical film series
Romance film series
Fantasy film series
American film series
Warner Bros. Pictures franchises
Films based on Cinderella